Pizzul is a surname. Notable people with the surname include:

Bruno Pizzul (born 1938), Italian footballer and journalist
Filandia Elisa Pizzul (1902–1987), first woman to graduate from a school of architecture in Argentina
Luca Pizzul (born 1999), Italian footballer